Leamington may refer to:

Places
 Leamington Spa, Warwickshire, England
 Leamington Hastings, Warwickshire, England
 Leamington, Ontario, Canada
 Leamington, Utah, US
 Leamington, Cambridge, a suburb of Cambridge, New Zealand
 Leamington, Canterbury, a locality in the Canterbury Region of New Zealand

Other uses
 HMS Leamington, two Royal Navy vessels
 Leamington (horse), a 19th-century racehorse
 Leamington F.C., the Leamington Spa football club

See also
 Lemington (disambiguation)
 Lymington, a town in Hampshire, England
 Lymington River, Hampshire, England